Höllbach is a river of Bavaria, Germany. It is the right headstream of the Schwesnitz in Rehau. For 1.7 km it forms the border between Germany and the Czech Republic. The westernmost point of the Czech Republic is on its left tributary Mähringsbach.

See also
List of rivers of Bavaria

References

External links
Picture of border stones on the Újezdský potok

Rivers of Bavaria
Rivers of the Karlovy Vary Region
Rivers of Germany
Hof (district)
International rivers of Europe
Border rivers
Czech Republic–Germany border